Zvonko Monsider was a Croatian football goalkeeper. He played for both the Croatian and Yugoslavian national teams.

Playing career

Club
He started his career with Ferraria Zagreb before moving to Concordia Zagreb in 1939. He played with Concordia until the establishment of the new regime club Dinamo Zagreb. Monsider was one of three Concordia players to move to the new club (along with Vinko Golob and Slavko Beda).

International
He made his debut for the Independent State of Croatia, a World War II-era puppet state of Nazi Germany, in a June 1942 friendly match away against Slovakia and played 6 games for that team, scoring no goals. After the war he played for Yugoslavia, collecting another 7 caps and his final international was a September 1947 Balkan Cup match away against Albania.

Managerial career
He later became a manager with Sabadell, Barakaldo CF, UE Sants, Terrassa FC, CE L'Hospitalet.

References

External links
 
Profile at Serbian federation

1920 births
1997 deaths
Footballers from Zagreb
Association football goalkeepers
Croatian footballers
Croatia international footballers
Yugoslav footballers
Yugoslavia international footballers
Dual internationalists (football)
HŠK Concordia players
GNK Dinamo Zagreb players
S.S. Lazio players
Calcio Padova players
Unión Magdalena footballers
Yugoslav First League players
Serie A players
Yugoslav expatriate footballers
Expatriate footballers in Italy
Yugoslav expatriate sportspeople in Italy
Expatriate footballers in Colombia
Yugoslav expatriate sportspeople in Colombia
Yugoslav football managers
CE Sabadell FC managers
Barakaldo CF managers
UE Sants managers
Terrassa FC managers
CE L'Hospitalet managers
Yugoslav expatriate football managers
Expatriate football managers in Spain
Yugoslav expatriate sportspeople in Spain